Robin Roshardt (born 22 February 1988) is a Swiss former professional tennis player.

Roshardt, a son of Federation Cup player Claudia Pasquale, had a best ranking of four on the ITF junior circuit and was the 18 & Under Orange Bowl champion in 2005, becoming the third Swiss to win the title. 

Unable to replicate his junior success on the men's tour, Roshardt's only two ATP Tour main draw appearances came at the Suisse Open Gstaad, as a wildcard entrant in both 2006 and 2008.

ATP Challenger and ITF Futures finals

Singles: 3 (1–2)

References

External links
 
 

1988 births
Living people
Swiss male tennis players
Tennis players from Zürich